The World Billiards Championship is an international cue sports tournament in the discipline of English billiards, organised by World Billiards, a subsidiary of the World Professional Billiards and Snooker Association (WPBSA). In its various forms, and usually as a single competition, the title is one of the oldest sporting world championships, having been contested (though irregularly) since 1870.

From 2012 to 2014 there were separate timed and points divisions, with the tournament held in association with the International Billiards and Snooker Federation. In those years, there was no separate IBSF World Billiards Championship. 

The rules adopted by the Billiards Association in 1899 are essentially the rules still used today. The tournament has been played on a regular annual schedule since 1980, when it became administered by the WPBSA. The event was known as the World Professional Billiards Championship until 2010, and has had other names in the past, e.g. Billiards Championship of the World. In addition, the World Ladies Billiards Championship has been played since 1931 (with interruptions) and organized by World Ladies Billiards and Snooker since 1998.

History 
In the early 19th century, there was no recognised governing body or formal championship for English billiards. Jack Carr and Edwin Kentfield were prominent players when Carr challenged Kentfield to a championship game in 1825. Carr died on the eve of the match, and Kentfield hence assumed the title. He would remain unchallenged for 24 years.

John Roberts Sr., who had spent years touring and establishing his reputation as a billiards player, challenged Kentfield. There was much controversy over the table and the pockets to be used, and Kentfield declined to play, so Roberts styled himself as champion, a title he held unchallenged until 1870, when he lost to William Cook.

As this was the first actual match for the World Championship, the players themselves drew up a special set of rules for the game. Cook was nonetheless considered the favourite, and the 20-year-old had greatly improved since his win over Roberts Jr. the previous year. At 1:38 a.m. on the morning of 12 February 1870, Cook defeated Roberts to win the title, and won a newly created trophy, £100, and a Maltese cross. The match at St. James's Hall in London was attended by Edward VII, the Prince of Wales. This match ended the dominance of Roberts Sr., as a wave of new players took over the game.

The February 1870 match initiated the World Championship, and led to many challenges for the title. Roberts Jr. and Cook were the dominant players of the era. There were occasional uncontested matches. The rule said that a player had to accept a challenge within two months of it being issued; if the challenge were ignored, the challenger became World Champion.

There was still the issue of the rules, however. Many players preferred the "spot-barred" style with limitations on the number of consecutive pots of the red that were allowed, but some preferred the "all-in" rules that did not include this restriction. Repeated potting of the red was a great strength for William Peall in particular.

There were three all-in competitions held separately from the title held by Roberts, for which he was never challenged. Billy Mitchell and Peall excelled in the late 1880s.

Billiards Association and Control Council 
The Billiards Association (later the Billiards Association and Control Council or BA&CC) was formed in February 1885, and produced a new set of rules in September 1885. They sanctioned two championships, one with a "spot-barred" format and the other "all-in". Roberts Jr. showed no interest in the competition, but the tournaments went ahead regardless. The "championship table" that had been created by Roberts Sr. was abandoned, and the normal table was used instead. Peall held the all-in title unchallenged, whereas Mitchell dominated the spot-barred competition.

In 1899, after five years with no challenges to the titles, the Billiards Association changed the rules of the game. After two spot strokes, the red would be replaced on the centre spot, to limit the repetition of "all-in" play. Although detrimental to his personal fortunes, Peall accepted this change and voted for the introduction of the new rule. This gave rise to the modern version of English billiards that is still played (with minor revisions) today.

There were many challenges for the title before 1911, but the competition was then amended to cope with the influx of new professionals and it became an annual tournament. Walter Lindrum won the title in 1934, after which the championship collapsed. Only two challenge matches took place over the next three decades, one in 1951 and another in 1964.

While on a trip to Australia in 1968, Rex Williams decided to travel to Auckland to challenge the reigning champion Clark McConachy for the billiards title. This was the first contest since McConachy's 1951 win and, aged 73 by this time, his play was affected by his Parkinson's disease. In what turned out to be a poor-quality match, Williams won the title.

WPBSA title 
Leslie Driffield, a member of the BA&CC, was present at a meeting where the Council nominated him as the challenger to Rex Williams for the professional Billiards Championship. Williams declined to play Driffield within the five-month time limit set by the BA&CC, which expired on 7 July 1970, thus forfeiting the title, which was then contested between Driffield and Jack Karnehm in June 1971. On 1 October 1970, the Professional Billiard Players Association (PBPA)—which had been re-established in 1968 by Williams and seven other players—disaffiliated from the BA&CC. The PBPA then changed its name to the World Professional Billiards and Snooker Association (WPBSA) on 12 December 1970, and declared itself the governing body for the professional game, recognising Williams as champion. Driffield and Karnehm were, at first, the only two professionals who recognised the BA&CC as having continued authority over the game.

In the 1970s, there were further challenge matches for the title. Williams was dominant in this period. In 1980, Fred Davis won at the age of 67 to become World Champion. Since the 1980s, the world championship has sometimes been contested as a series of shorter games, for example in 150-up, the first player to win a designated number of games of first-to-150 is the victor.

From 1989 to 2011, Mike Russell was the dominant player, closely followed by Geet Sethi who won five titles. Some Australian players were successful in the 1980s, most notably Robby Foldvari (winner 1986, runner-up 1987) and Eddie Charlton (twice runner-up, 1984 and 1988).

In November 2011, WPBSA formed a subsidiary called World Billiards (Limited), to administer the sport worldwide. As of 2012, the distinction between professional and amateur players was removed and the WPBSA World Professional Championship was merged with the former IBSF World Billiards Championship and simply became the World Billiards Championship. Tournaments were held in both points and timed format. In 2015, the IBSF withdrew from World Billiards Limited and reinstituted its own championship.

David Causier (with six titles), Pankaj Advani (three titles), and Peter Gilchrist are other multiple title winners in the modern game.

World Championship results 
Main sources: English Amateur Billiards Association, 
A History of Billiards (Clive Everton), Cue Sports India

Initial, self-declared World Champions

Challenge World Championships 
Additional Source: Billiards (1899) by Joseph Bennett

As there was no governing body in place, the rules were agreed between players, with representatives of The Sportsman newspaper providing arbitration if required.

Unofficial "all-in" World Championships 
These matches were arranged between the players, and not recognised by the Billiard Association.

"Championship of the World" tournaments 
With the Billiards Association championship in abeyance, the billiard table manufacturers George Wright and Company organised a "Championship of the World" tournament. The tournament was played in heats, with the heat between Mitchell and Peall proving decisive on each occasion.

Billiard Association tournament World Championships 
The Billiard Association organised separate championships for "all-in" and "spot barred" formats.

All-in

Spot-barred

Billiard Association challenge World Championships 
The Billiards Association published a new set of rules 1 October 1898 that prohibited the  stroke, and promoted one championship rather than two.

Billiard Control Club Championships 
The Billiard Control Club was established in 1908 as a rival to the Billiard Association and organised a separate championship.

Billiards Association and Control Council Championships 
After the 1919 Championship, the Billiard Association and the Billiard Control Club amalgamated and, as the Billiards Association and Control Club (later renamed as the Billiards Association and Control Council) organised an annual championship tournament.

Post-World War II Challenge World Championships

Billiards Association and Control Council challenge matches

WPBSA challenge matches

WPBSA World Championships

World Billiards Ltd World Championships

Notes

References

External links
 The Professional Championship, 1800–1899 English Amateur Billiards Association
 World Professional Billiards & Snooker Association (WPBSA) Official website
 World Billiards Official website

 
Recurring sporting events established in 1825
Competitions in English billiards
World championships in English billiards